Joseph Arthur Vigneron  (b. Mirecourt, 1851; d Paris, 1905) was an important  French Archetier / Bowmaker. 

He served his apprenticeship   with his stepfather Charles Claude Husson in Mirecourt, where he  studied side by side with Joseph Alfred Lamy père (father of the Lamy family of bow makers), who was less than a year older than he was. Vigneron worked with Husson until the latter's death in 1872, then he moved to the shop of Jean Joseph Martin. He worked for Gand & Bernardel Frères from 1880. 

His bows were quite solid and followed his own individual style. He selected the finest wood and worked it with loving care. He worked quickly, with powerful execution.
"He made a bow a day, it is said (or more like a batch of 6 bows per week). Bows made by a man upon whom nature had bestowed a mind deeply sensitive of the beautiful, and highly cultivated by experience.' 

Vigneron had a fairly even camber along the stick. The curve was not like Voirin's, behind the head, but more in the middle of the bow, closer to the grip. Vigneron also designed bows with  a sort of rounded triangular cross section which added stability to the bow (lower centre of gravity).

These bows were designed in collaboration with the violinist Lucien Capet (modele Lucien Capet was often stamped on such bows). 

Very elegant sticks with a fine and strong sway, and splendid heads overall giving the bow a uniquely individual playability. 

Vigneron's bow heads resemble  the Voirin school, and some have a feminine interpretation of a late period Pierre Simon.
 
His bows are mostly silver mounted, with solid buttons and matching Parisian eyes.
He was succeeded by his son André (1881 - 1924) a prolific maker in his father's style.

While he cannot qualify as a consistently great maker, his best bows can be ranked with the finest of his day, showing elegant craftsmanship and made of superb quality pernambuco. 

However, a large part of his output, while solidly made, lacks grace. Most of the bows are silver mounted; gold mountings are much less frequent and gold and tortoiseshell very rare.
The sticks are usually round and the heads have pronounced chamfers at the throat. Vuillaume-type frogs are occasionally seen but otherwise the frogs are regular with either rounded or square heels. His bows are branded a. vigneron à paris.

On J.A. Vigneron’s death, his shop was taken over by his son André Vigneron (1881–1924).

Quotes
"Few of the past French makers surpassed him in refinement."   

"Many musicians are unconditional admirers of the production of this great master."  

"Vigneron and Jules Fetique produced bows that at times could rival a Sartory in terms of strength and handling...." Stefan Hersh  

"Vigneron's bows show elegant craftsmanship as well as superb quality pernambuco. His best bows can be ranked with the finest of his day." Gennady Filimonov

References

 
 
 
 Dictionnaire Universel del Luthiers - Rene Vannes 1951,1972, 1985 (vol.3)
 Universal Dictionary of Violin & Bow Makers - William Henley 1970

1851 births
1905 deaths
Luthiers from Mirecourt